The Institut für Kunststoffverarbeitung in Industrie und Handwerk (IKV), the Institute for Plastics Processing in Industry and Trade at the Rheinisch-Westfälische Technische Hochschule Aachen, Germany, is a teaching and research institute for the study of plastics technology. It stands for practice-oriented research, innovation and technology transfer. The focus of the IKV is the integrative view of product development in the material, construction and processing sectors, in particular in plastics and rubber. The sponsor is a non-profit association that currently includes around 300 companies from the plastics industry worldwide (as of December 2018) and through which the institute maintains a close connection between industry and science.

The institute was founded in 1950 and, with around 350 employees, has become Europe's largest research and training institute in the field of plastics technology. From 1965 to 1988  headed the institute, and  until his retirement in 2011. He also holds the Chair for  within the Faculty of Mechanical Engineering at RWTH Aachen University.

Tasks 
The tasks of the institute are:

 scientific and practice-oriented research in the field of plastics technology
 the training of students to become qualified junior staff for the plastics industry
 the training of practitioners in the craft industry in the field of plastics technology

Structure 
The scientific departments injection molding/PUR technology, extrusion and further processing, molded part design/materials engineering and fibre-reinforced plastics are the operative units of the institute. The  (KAP) (English: Center for Plastics Analysis and Testing) at the IKV supports and advises scientific departments and is available as a service for the industry to solve problems. The training and education department is responsible nationwide for technology transfer to the skilled trades sector.

Currently, about 130 employees including some 80 scientists are working at the IKV in research, development and training. They are supported by about 220 student assistants. In addition to the tasks mentioned above, one of the goals of the IKV is to provide the industry with solutions to practical problems. Individual projects, but also those within the framework of  often lead to high-quality product ideas and developments, which, in the sense of the desired technology transfer, benefit not only larger, but foremost small and medium-sized enterprises.

References

External links 

 Website of the Institute for Plastics Processing

Research institutes in Germany
Research institutes established in 1950
Plastics industry
Plastics applications
Materials science
Engineering disciplines